The Technological University, Monywa is located on a 48.209 acre campus in Minywa, Sagaing Division, Myanmar.  It was established in 1982 as Technological High School. In 1986 it became Government Technological Institute. In 1999 it was promoted to Government Technological College (GTC). In 2007 the GTC was upgraded to university status. Now "Technological University (Monywa)" offers both undergraduate and graduate programmes.

Departments
Civil Engineering
Electrical Power Engineering
Electronic and Communication Engineering
Information Technology
Mechanical Engineering
Mechatronic Engineering
Textile Engineering
Burmese Language
English Language
Engineering Mathematics 
Engineering Chemistry 
Engineering Physics

Programmes

See also
Technological University Sagaing
Technological University (Kalay)
List of Technological Universities in Myanmar

References 
Official website:

http://www.tumonywa.edu.mm

Technological universities in Myanmar